Unity Day, the signature event of National Bullying Prevention Month (observed in the United States on third or fourth Wednesday of October), has been recognized in the United States since 2011. To participate in Unity Day, individuals, schools, communities, and businesses wear or share orange to unite for kindness, acceptance, and inclusion to prevent students being bullied. One in five school-age children report being bullied at school.

History
October 2020

Unity Day 2020 was celebrated in person as well as virtually by schools, individuals, businesses and media across the nation.

While participation during the time of COVID-19, distance learning, and social separation looked different, the theme remained the same - to wear and share orange to unite for kindness, acceptance and inclusion to prevent bullying. Communities stepped up to the challenge of finding new ways to celebrate. A few highlights include:
 Almost 4000 posts to #UnityDay2020
 Audience shared photos of video conferencing with everyone wearing orange
 Many schools had hearts made of orange construction paper in their windows, along with orange messages on the sidewalk
 One teacher had students submit messages, and they then created a Unity Tree, sharing that image 
 5000 signature T-shirts sold
 Educators made collages of images sent in by students wearing orange
 4000 signatures (in one day) to the online pledge

October 2019

Schools coast-to-coast and around the world demonstrated their support for Unity Day in unique ways. In Minnesota, where it all began, PACER Associated Director Tammy Pust and Minnesota Education Commissioner Mary Cathryn Ricker made a Unity Tree with 5th graders at Parkview Center School. In Los Angeles, a student at Watts Empowerment Center created a community garden where people united to grow both vegetables and their connection to the community. In Annapolis, Maryland, Anne Arundel County Public Schools distributed over 900 Unity Day posters to every school in their district. The district's schools celebrated in a variety of ways, with one school featuring all orange lunch options! And across the ocean, the entire student body of nearly 600 children at Vilseck Elementary School in Vilseck, Germany, wore orange to show their support.

PACER's National Bullying Prevention Center focused on some incredible partnerships with Cartoon Network's Stop Bulling: Speak Up initiative, Planet Fitness’ Judgement Free Generation, and Instagram. These partnerships produced engaging content and resources to help spread the message of kindness, acceptance, and inclusion.

October 2018

Unity Day 2018 was celebrated across the nation by schools, students, community organizations, businesses, and media.

Disney and ABC supported Unity Day.
 Lou: A video short streamed on Disney's home page
 LIVE with Kelly & Ryan posted on Instagram
 Cast from The VIEW spoke about Unity Day, watch the short clip at: https://twitter.com/TheView/status/1055112956491399168

Hawaii Governor David Ige and staff created a video, https://twitter.com/GovHawaii/status/1055271665670606849

Cartoonists unite for kindness, acceptance and inclusion,  https://www.washingtonpost.com/arts-entertainment/2018/10/24/six-chix-mutts-among-comics-combatting-bullying-unity-day/

Many local news stations featured stories of action in their community, watch coverage from KARE11 out of Minneapolis, MN https://www.kare11.com/article/news/unityday2018-reaches-all-corners-of-the-world/89-607792939

Schools created videos: Ontario Christian High School students discuss how OC can continue to be united. https://www.youtube.com/watch?v=vyT7HW5DWak
 Eden Prairie Schools take part in Unity Day, https://www.youtube.com/watch?v=Bif1ozj_ibgSeveral newspaper comics made a strip about bullying to raise awareness of the day.October 2017Special thank you to the local newspapers, news stations and international news sources which feature stories about how Unity Day 2017 was celebrated in the community. The following are just a sampling of some of the stories:

 Georgetown Cupcake goes orange: TLC partnered with PACER's National Bullying Prevention Center and Georgetown Cupcake to show their support for bullying prevention. They celebrated Unity Day with delicious orange cupcakes. Georgetown Cupcake sold the cupcakes on Unity Day, and TLC hosted a corporate event to distribute treats as they united for kindness, acceptance, and inclusion.
 ‘Little People, Big World’: Amy Roloff wants to help create a world without bullying: Amy Roloff, one of the stars of TLC’s Little People, Big World, is no stranger to bullying, which is why she is uniting against it. Amy wore orange to commemorate Unity Day and said that she wanted to show everyone who has ever been bullied that they don't have to face it alone (Inquisitr, 2017).
 On Unity Day, school districts set their sights on bullying: Classrooms across the country filled with students and staff who celebrated Unity Day by dressing in orange as a symbol of support. Richmond Public Schools in Virginia, Hays Consolidated Independent School District in Texas, and Wayzata Public Schools in Minnesota are profiled in this article illustrating the creative ways they showed their support for bullying prevention through activities, videos, posters, and unity trees (TrustED, 2017).
 Recognizing Unity Day: Students with disabilities don orange to help promote bullying prevention: Students, ages 18–21 with disabilities, in the transitions program, and their teachers, at Brookside Education Center in Minnesota, wore orange to celebrate Unity Day. Children with disabilities are two to three times more likely to be bullied than their non-disabled peers. Transitions program instructor Lori Nelson said each of her five students have been bullied. Nelson said that for her students, Unity Day is as much about bullying prevention as it is about respect. The orange T-shirts they wore had the word "HERO" written vertically as an acrostic down the front saying "Helping Everyone Respect Others" (Albert Lea Tribune, 2017).
 Central Junior High School in Illinois working together to prevent bullying: More than 350 students and staff at Central Junior High School in Illinois wore orange shirts to send the message "Together against bullying. United for kindness, acceptance and inclusion." Central has participated in Unity Day since 2015. While Unity Day sheds light on the issue of bullying, Central staff members work hard all year to foster an accepting environment. The teachers and other staff are always on the lookout for signs of bullying. School staff acknowledge that they are only one part of a larger team. Parents, families, and the whole community must work together to prevent bullying (Star Courier, 2017).
 Building on last year’s North Branch Unity Day: Students and staff at the North Branch Area Middle School in Minnesota wore orange on Unity Day to send a unified message that students care about each other, and that bullying will not be accepted in school or in the community. In addition to wearing orange, students participated in a "Kindness Rocks" event. Each student at NBAMS was provided a stone upon which to paint a message of kindness. To make it most meaningful, each student placed their own rock in the new Kindness Corner of the courtyard for permanent display. (Isanti-Chisago County Star, 2017).
 DODEA students take a stand against bullying: Students at Ramstein Intermediate School in Germany wore orange while uniting against bullying in celebration of Unity Day. Gathered in the school's courtyard, hundreds of pupils in grades 3, 4 and 5 sang songs, held hands, and recited a bullying prevention pledge, vowing not to let their "actions or words hurt others." Students joined music teacher Steven Rayburn in singing "Don't Laugh at Me" during the school's celebration of Unity Day. In the song, children who have been teased, among others, ask for acceptance from others (Stars and Stripes, 2017).
 Ella White students participate in no bullying, Unity Day: Ella White Elementary students in Michigan participated in different activities at school to show that they are against bullying during Unity Day. The school's 465 students made a paper chain that sends the message to unite to prevent bullying. Students also signed a poster saying they will pledge to speak up about bullying and reach out to those who are bullied. All the students received an orange bracelet to show their support for those who are bullied (The Alpena News, 2017).
 Main Street School stands up against bullying on Unity Day: Main Street School students and staff members in New York celebrated Unity Day by uniting against bullying and wearing orange shirts to show their support. Unity Day provided an opportunity for students to celebrate the friendships they've fostered within their school community. Throughout October, the students participated in the "Be a Friend Project," which brings peer support to young targets of bullying through letters of hope, and letting young bullying targets know that they matter and they are not alone (Rivertowns Patch, 2017).
 North Warren Central School dons orange: Students in K-12 in Chestertown, Pa., wore orange T-shirts in a Unity Day event to symbolize being united against bullying. Mike Therio, who coordinated the event, said the Council for Prevention, located in Hudson Falls, provided about 520 orange T-shirts, one for each of the students at the North Warren Central School. The Council for Prevention fosters healthy communities, schools, families, and individuals, urging a collaborative effort in preventing and treating various issues, including bullying. "I’m pleased to say virtually every student brought their shirt back and wore it," Therio said. On one of the posters near the cafeteria, students posted hearts with the name (or relationship) of someone who had encouraged or supported them. "The kids really got into it," Therio said. "It’s an opportunity to show solidarity and unity."October 2016On Unity Day 2016, once again individuals, schools, communities, corporations, and celebrities joined against bullying – and united for kindness, acceptance, and inclusion. A few highlights include:

 	The campaign was supported by corporations including: CustomInk, Disney, Facebook, Instagram, and Simon & Schuster, Inc.
 	Talent from the TLC network, including Jazz Jennings, Busby Quintuplets from Outdaughtered, Whitney Waythore, and Jarling Perez from Sweet 15: Quinceanera shared their support by wearing orange.
 	LoservilleFilm partnered with PACER's National Bullying Prevention Center. #TeamLoserville wanted everyone to hear the important message that no one should ever have to endure the pain of being hurt, harmed and humiliated. Cast and crew, including Sara Ramirez and Darby Stanchfield wore orange.
 	Over 12,000 Unity Day posters were distributed.
 	A large financial company had a morning greeting with a treat for Unity Day, as well as all their staff wearing orange!
 	Guggenheim Elementary School (K-5) in Port Washington, N.Y., created a smiley face emoji featuring students and staff all in orange.
 	Brletic Elementary had their full orange on for Unity Day, with a drone taking aerial shots of their students on the blacktop!October 2015On Unity Day 2015, individuals, schools, communities, corporations, and celebrities joined against bullying – and united for kindness, acceptance, and inclusion.

 	The campaign was supported by corporations including: CustomInk, Disney, Facebook, Instagram, and the TLC network
 	YouTube sensation Bethany Mota kicked off Unity Day with a media tour and an event at Mall of America on Oct. 20.
 	Disney Interactive employees in the United States wore orange and held events to promote kindness, acceptance, and inclusion.
 	TLC Network talent, including Buddy Valastro, Stacy London and Monte, wore orange and posted positive messages on social media.
 	Nearly 8,000 Unity Day posters were sent to schools and organizations around the country.
 	A dentist office in Minnesota used orange rubber bands for braces.
 	An entire community in Colorado placed orange ribbons on every tree.
 	A school in Illinois handed out orange "kudos" to kids caught doing random acts of kindness.October 2014

Unity Day 2014 was celebrated by students, educators, families, TV personalities, corporations, and others around the world. Individuals wore orange, held events, and shared stories, photos, videos, and more on social media.
 	PACER's campaign was supported by corporations including: CustomInk, Disney, Facebook, Frito-Lay, Galderma, Green Giant, and the TLC network.
 	Disney employees in the United States, Canada, the United Kingdom, and Argentina honored Unity Day in a variety of ways, from wearing orange to dedicating acts of kindness to each other.
 	Australian motivational speaker, author, and PACER partner Nick Vujicic, who was born without arms and legs, held a press conference in Mexico and posted videos for his millions of followers on Facebook.
 	Talent from TLC network, including Buddy Valastro, wore orange, and TLC changed its logo to orange for the day.
 	In Mexico, a middle school held the first international Run, Walk, Roll Against Bullying event.
 	Students in New Zealand decorated bullying prevention cookies. 
 	A school in Taiwan displayed Unity Day posters.
 	In Culver, Indiana, local businesses hung Unity Day banners and painted their windows with bullying prevention messages. At schools, inspirational messages were posted on every locker.
 	At Incarnate Word Academy in Corpus Christi, Texas, students celebrated Unity by wearing orange shirts, placing orange ribbons on locker handles, and participating in bullying prevention activities in the classroom.
 	Nearly 500 students and school staff in Hilbert, Wis., showed their commitment by standing together in a gymnasium to spell a giant human U-N-I-T-Y, and doing a district-wide Unity Dance.
 	"I’m Good," a powerful bullying prevention song by renowned producer Clinton Sparks and hit recording artists The Mowgli's and Kylie Morgan, was released in October 2014. The song was inspired by creative contributions about bullying from teens as part of the "Band Together to Banish Bullying Campaign," a partnership between PACER and Galderma Laboratories, L.P., the makers of Epiduo Gel.

 October 2013
Unity Day was supported by several national partners, including Disney/ABC Family and Cartoon Network, through public service announcements (PSAs) and social media promotion. In addition, the fifty-five foot tall statue of the Green Giant in Blue Earth, Minnesota wore an orange toga for the day.

 October 2012
Unity Day continued to gather support from individuals, schools, and celebrities. Anderson Cooper wore orange on his TV show, Anderson Live'', and promoted the event.

 October 2011
Unity Day was started by PACER's National Bullying Prevention Center as a signature event of National Bullying Prevention Month. The call to action was to "Make it Orange and Make it End. Unite Against Bullying!" Participants were encouraged to wear orange to show their support for bullying prevention. Ellen DeGeneres participated in Unity Day in 2011 by wearing orange on her TV show, Ellen, and posting about the event on her website.

 2007

The United Nations declared the official anti-bullying day as May 4, starting in 2012.

References

External links
PACER's National Bullying Prevention Center
PACER Teens Against Bullying
PACER Kids Against Bullying
PACER Center-Champions for Children with Disabilities

Civil awareness days
Observances in the United States
October observances